Taenidia is a small genus of flowering plants in the carrot family, commonly known as pimpernels. This genus is native only to eastern North America.

This genus consists of somewhat delicate perennials that flower in late spring and early summer.

Species
 Taenidia integerrima - yellow pimpernel; widespread in eastern North America
 Taenidia montana - mountain pimpernel; restricted to the central Appalachian Mountains

References

Apioideae
Taxa named by Carl Georg Oscar Drude
Apioideae genera